This article compares different orbital launcher families (although many launchers that are significantly different from other members of the same 'family' have their own separate entries). The article is organized into two tables: the first table contains a list of currently active and under-development launcher families, while the second table contains a list of retired launcher families.

The related article "Comparison of orbital launch systems" contains tables that list each individual launcher system within any given launcher family, categorized by its current operational status.

Description 

 Family: Name of the family/model of launcher
 Country: Origin country of launcher
 Manufac.: Main manufacturer
 Payload: Maximum mass of payload, for 3 altitudes
 LEO, low Earth orbit
 GTO, geostationary transfer orbit
 TLI, trans-Lunar injection
 Cost: Price for a launch at this time, in millions of US$
 Launches reaching...
 Total: Flights which lift-off, or where the vehicle is destroyed during the terminal countNote: only includes orbital launches (flights launched with the intention of reaching orbit). Suborbital tests launches are not included in this listing.
 Space (regardless of outcome): Flights which reach approximately 100 km  or more above Earth's surface.
 Any orbit (regardless of outcome): Flights which achieve at least one complete orbit even if the orbit differs from the targeted orbit.
 Target orbit (without damage to the payload)
 Status: Actual status of launcher (retired, development, active)
 Date of flight
 First: Year of first flight of first family member
 Last (if applicable): Year of Last flight (for vehicles retired from service)
 Refs: citations

Same cores are grouped together (like Ariane 1, 2 & 3, but not V).

List of active and under-development launcher families

List of retired launcher families

See also 
 Comparison of orbital launch systems
 Comparison of orbital rocket engines
 Comparison of space station cargo vehicles
 List of orbital launch systems

Notes

References

Technological comparisons